CWFC may refer to:

 Cage Warriors Fighting Championship
 Clipstone Welfare F.C.
 Cork Women's F.C.
 Cray Wanderers F.C.